Kahak (also Romanized as Kāhak; also known as Kahe, Kāheh, and Khak) is a village in Mazinan Rural District, Central District, Davarzan County, Razavi Khorasan Province, Iran. At the 2006 census, its population was 375, in 124 families.

Famous natives
Ali Shariati, Iran revolutionary

References

Gallery

Populated places in Davarzan County